HC TSV Bayer 04 Leverkusen is a Germany women's handball club from Leverkusen representing TSV Bayer 04 Leverkusen in the Handball-Bundesliga Frauen.

Bayer Leverkusen won six national championships between 1965 and 1980, and six more titles in a row between 1982 and 1987, its most successful period. It was the only team from West Germany to reach the European Cup's final before the country's reunification, in 1984, and seven years later it also played the EHF Women's Cup's final. In 2005 it finally won its first international title, a Challenge Cup. In recent years it has won the 2010 German Cup and reached the EHF Cup and Cup Winners' Cup's semifinals.

Kits

Titles
 Challenge Cup
 2005
 German League
 1965, 1966, 1973, 1974, 1979, 1980, 1982, 1983, 1984, 1985, 1986, 1987
 German Cup
 1980, 1982, 1983, 1984, 1985, 1987, 1991, 2002, 2010

Team

Current squad
Squad for the 2022–23 season

Goalkeepers
 1  Lieke van der Linden
 21  Miranda Nasser
 95  Nela Zuzic
Wingers
LW
 26  Loreen Veit
 9  Jennifer Souza

RW
 18  Emilia Ronge
 20  Pia Terfloth

Line players
 8  Fem Boeters
 13  Ariane Pfundstein
 37  Marie Teusch

Back players
LB
 9  Naina Klein
 22  Mariana Ferreira Lopes

CB
 3  Živilė Jurgutytė
 2  Mareike Thomaier
 10  Sophia Cormann
 11  Marla Mathwig
RB
 7  Viola Leuchter
 14  Lynn Kuipers

Transfers
Transfers for the 2023-24 season 

Joining
  Christin Kaufmann (RW) (from own rows)

Leaving
  Emilia Ronge (RW) (to  VfL Oldenburg)

Notable former players 

  Kristine Andersen (1996-1997)
  Valentyna Salamakha (2011-2015)
  Katrin Engel (2009-2010)
  Kristina Logvin (2013-2015)
  Debbie Klijn (1999-2004)
  Branka Zec (2016-2018)
  Sally Potocki (2016-2019)
  Sabine Englert (2003-2007)
  Nadine Krause (2001–2007, 2011-2012)
  Anna Loerper (2003-2011)
  Jenny Karolius (2014-2019)
  Jennifer Rode (2014-2020)
  Anne Müller (1999-2010)
  Sabrina Richter (2004–2008)
  Laura Steinbach (2007-2013)
  Clara Woltering (2000-2011)
  Katja Kramarczyk (2016-2018)
  Sabrina Neukamp (2004-2008)
  Kim Naidzinavicius (2011-2016)
  Marlene Zapf (2009-2014)
  Amelie Berger (2016-2019)
  Aimée von Pereira (2018-2019)
  Kim Braun (2014-2018)

References

Handball
German handball clubs
Women's handball clubs
Women's handball in Germany